The NATO Support and Procurement Agency, abbreviated to NSPA, is the main logistics and procurement agency of the North Atlantic Treaty Organisation (NATO) and is the executive branch of the NATO Support and Procurement Organisation (NSPO), formerly NATO Maintenance and Supply Organization (NAMSO).

Until 2012, the tasks were organised with the NATO Supply Agency and other institutions. It has about 1200 employees in Luxembourg, France, Italy and Hungary.

On 1 April 2015, organisation and structure of NSPO and NSPA changed. This change marks the expansion of Agency capabilities to include all aspects of systems procurement from initial acquisition throughout sustainment.

NSPA covers five areas: 
Systems Procurement and Life Cycle Management
Support to Operations and Exercises
Strategic Transport and Storage
Logistics Services and Project Management
Fuel Management

The headquarter of NSPA is situated in the town of Capellen, in the commune of Mamer, in south-western Luxembourg.

References

NSPA
Military logistics
Organisations based in Mamer
Organizations established in 1958